Grzegorz Lach (born 1967) is a Polish historian. He finished history at Silesian University in Katowice, where in 2007 he gained a Ph.D. His research area is ancient Greece and he is a well-known author of books about this topic.

Books 
 2007 - Wyprawa sycylijska 415-413 p.n.e.
 2008 - Sztuka wojenna starożytnej Grecji. Od zakończenia wojen perskich do wojny korynckiej
 2010 - Salamina-Plateje 480-479 p.n.e.
 2011 - Alkibiades. Wódz i polityk
 2012 - Wojny diadochów 323-281 p.n.e.
 2014 - Ipsos 301 p.n.e.

References

20th-century Polish historians
Polish male non-fiction writers
Living people
1967 births
21st-century Polish historians